Recanto is an album by Brazilian singer Gal Costa, released in 2011. The album was written and produced by Caetano Veloso.

Track listing
"Recanto Escuro" (3:51)
"Cara do Mundo" (2:52)
"Autotune Autoerótico" (3:40)
"Tudo Dói" (2:41)
"Neguinho" (5:35)
"O Menino" (4:28)
"Madre Deus" (3:35)
"Mansidão" (3:32)
"Sexo e Dinheiro" (3:40)
"Miami Maculelê" (4:06)
"Segunda" (3:49)

Personnel
Caetano Veloso – Producer
Moreno Veloso -  Engineer, Producer
Kassin - Producer

References

Gal Costa albums
2011 albums
Albums produced by Caetano Veloso